Jérôme Foulon (born 6 February 1971 in Raillencourt-Sainte-Olle, France) is a former professional footballer who played as a right-back. Whilst at Guingamp he won the 1996 UEFA Intertoto Cup.

Honours
Guingamp
 UEFA Intertoto Cup: 1996

References

External links
 
 Jérôme Foulon profile at chamoisfc79.fr

1971 births
Living people
French footballers
Association football defenders
Valenciennes FC players
Lille OSC players
En Avant Guingamp players
Chamois Niortais F.C. players
Ligue 1 players
Ligue 2 players